Limpia Creek, originally known as the Rio Limpia, is a stream that heads in Jeff Davis County, Texas and its mouth is in Pecos County, Texas. Limpa is the Spanish word for "clear or clean water". The creek has its head in the Davis Mountains at an elevation of 7,160 feet, at location  on the northeast slope of Mount Livermore.

History
Limpia Creek was a water and forage stop on the San Antonio-El Paso Road for freighters, and stage companies like the San Antonio-San Diego Mail Line that had a stop at a camp 32 miles west of Hackberry Pond and 18.86 miles from Fort Davis.  The Butterfield Overland Mail located their Limpia Station near the mouth Limpia Canyon 18 miles from Fort Davis, 10 miles west of Barela Springs Station farther down Limpia Creek.

See also
List of rivers of Texas

References

Bodies of water of Jeff Davis County, Texas
Bodies of water of Pecos County, Texas
Pecos River
Rivers of Texas
San Antonio–El Paso Road
San Antonio–San Diego Mail Line
Butterfield Overland Mail in Texas
Stagecoach stops in the United States